Aleksandrowo  is a settlement in the administrative district of Gmina Gostyń, within Gostyń County, Greater Poland Voivodeship, in west-central Poland.

The settlement has a population of 1.

References

Villages in Gostyń County